Anchylorhynchus is a genus of weevils belonging the family Curculionidae and subfamily Curculioninae. It currently includes 25 described species distributed from Panama to Argentina. Members of the genus are pollinators of palms in the genera Syagrus, Oenocarpus and Butia, with adults living in inflorescences and larvae feeding on developing fruits. The first instar larvae of Anchylorhynchus have an unusual morphology, being specialized on killing other larvae infesting the palm fruits.

Adult morphology
Anchylorhynchus can be readily distinguished from other Derelomini by a number of features. The body is round, convex, and densely covered by scales varying from yellow to black. The rostrum is flattened dorso-verntrally at the apex, and exhibits 2-7 longitudinal grooves from the base of the rostrum to the insertion of antennae. The antennal funicle (segments excluding the first and the club) has only six segments, as opposed to seven segments in other genera. The antennae are inserted at the apex of the rostrum in both sexes, while it is inserted closer to the base in most other Curculionidae (at least in females).

Species of Anchylorhynchus are sexually dimorphic, with males usually being larger than females. In some species, males also have longer tarsi, and/or denser and longer hairs in the ventrites, metasternum and tarsi. In all described species, females have a retraction in ventrites III-IV of the abdomen. The shape and degree of retraction varies between species, but these segments are always flat in males.

Larval morphology and behavior

Larvae of Anchylorhynchus go through 4 stages (instars) before molting into a pupa.
The most distinctive stage is the first instar. First-instar larvae of Anchylorhynchus are unique in Curculionidae due to their falcate mandibles (usually found in insects that feed on other insects). Additionally, they are flattened dorso-ventrally, living between sepals and petals of female palm flowers. After hatching, larvae migrate to the base of the female flower, drilling a hole into the developing fruit. After entering the fruit, larvae molt and start consuming plant tissues, causing abortion of developing fruits. First- and second instar larvae attack and consume other larvae upon encountering them. Later instars avoid other larvae and are not aggressive.  
Starting on the second instar, larvae acquire the grub-like, cylindrical and C-shaped body characteristic of other Curculionidae. The mandible also changes its shape, becoming triangular and broad, adapted to crush plant tissues.

Interaction with plants

Adults Anchylorhynchus visit male and female flowers of several palm species in the genera Syagrus, Oenocarpus and Butia. Anchylorhynchus minimus might be associated with Euterpe edulis, but this is still unconfirmed. Adults use their rostrum to open male flowers and feed on pollen. While resting, they remain in the branches of the inflorescence or hidden at its base. Unlike most Curculionidae, females do not use the rostrum to drill an oviposition hole in plant tissues. Instead, they lay eggs directly between petals and sepals of female flowers.

The first observation about natural history of Anchylorhynchus was published by Faust, who described A. burmeisteri from specimens collected from palms in Argentina. Gregório Bondar made most of the subsequent observations, recording host plants for many species. He considered A. trapezicollis to be a pest of the palm known as licuri (Syagrus coronata). He observed that adults fed on pollen and conjectured that larvae might feed on flowers, even though he never observed them. More recently, the full life cycle of A. eriospathae has been described, showing that larvae feed on developing seeds and adults on pollen. Also, species of Anchylorhynchus have been shown to be important pollinators of Oenocarpus bataua, Oenocarpus balickii, Oenocarpus minor, Butia paraguayensis and Syagrus loefgrenii.

Taxonomy
There are currently 25 valid species of Anchylorhynchus.

The following list shows all valid species, with recognized synonyms shown indented:

 Anchylorhynchus aegrotus Fåhraeus, 1843
 Anchylorhynchus albidus Bondar, 1943
 Anchylorhynchus amazonicus Voss, 1943
 Anchylorhynchus bicarinatus O'Brien, 1981
 Anchylorhynchus gottsbergerorum Vanin, 1995
 Anchylorhynchus bicolor Voss, 1943
 Anchylorhynchus leiospathae Bondar, 1950
 Anchylorhynchus bucki Vanin, 1973
 Anchylorhynchus burmeisteri Faust, 1894
 Anchylorhynchus camposi Bondar, 1941
 Anchylorhynchus centrosquamatus de Medeiros & Núñez-Avellaneda, 2013
 Anchylorhynchus chrysomeloides de Medeiros & Vanin, 2020
 Anchylorhynchus goiano de Medeiros & Vanin, 2020
 Anchylorhynchus imitator de Medeiros & Vanin, 2020
 Anchylorhynchus latipes de Medeiros & Vanin, 2020
 Anchylorhynchus luteobrunneus de Medeiros & Núñez-Avellaneda, 2013
 Anchylorhynchus minimus Bondar, 1950
 Anchylorhynchus multisquamis de Medeiros & Vanin, 2020
 Anchylorhynchus parcus Fåhraeus, 1843
 Anchylorhynchus pinocchio de Medeiros & Núñez-Avellaneda, 2013
 Anchylorhynchus rectus de Medeiros & Vanin, 2020
 Anchylorhynchus trapezicollis Hustache, 1940
 Anchylorhynchus bleyi Bondar, 1941
 Anchylorhynchus botryophorae Bondar, 1941
 Anchylorhynchus tremolerasi Hustache, 1937
 Anchylorhynchus eriospathae Bondar, 1943
 Anchylorhynchus hatschbachi Bondar, 1943
 Anchylorhynchus pictipennis Hustache, 1937
 Anchylorhynchus tricarinatus Vaurie, 1954
 Anchylorhynchus vanini Valente & de Medeiros, 2013
 Anchylorhynchus variabilis Gyllenhaal, 1836
 Anchylorhynchus mutabilis Fåhraeus, 1843
Anchylorhynchus mutabilis connata Voss, 1943
 Anchylorhynchus vittipennis Voss, 1943
 Anchylorhynchus nigripennis Voss, 1943
 Anchylorhynchus lineatus Bondar, 1943

References

Curculioninae
Beetles described in 1836
Articles containing video clips
Beetles of South America